Antoine Eugène Genoud (1792-1849) was a French theologian and politician.

Early life
Antoine Eugène Genoud was born on 9 February 1792 in Montélimar, France. He was educated in Grenoble.

Career
Genoud was a Roman Catholic theologian. He served as a member of the National Assembly from 1846 to 1848.

Death
Genoud died on 19 April 1849 in Hyères, France.

Bibliography
Réflexions sur quelques questions politiques (1814).
Voyage dans la Vendée et dans le midi de la France, suivi d'un Voyage pittoresque en Suisse (Paris: Nicolle, 1821).
Considérations sur les Grecs et les Turcs (1821).
La Raison du christianisme ou preuves de la religion, tirées des écrits des plus grands hommes (1834-1835).
La Vie de Jésus-Christ et des Apôtres, tirée des saints Évangiles (1836).Leçons et modèles de littérature sacrée (with Jacques Honoré Lelarge de Lourdoueix, 1837).La Raison monarchique (1838).Exposition du dogme catholique (1840).Défense du christianisme par les Pères (1842).La divinité de Jésus-Christ annoncée par les prophètes (1842).Lettres sur l'Angleterre (1842).Histoire d'une âme (1844).Histoire de France (1844-1848).Sermons et conférences'' (1846).

References

1792 births
1849 deaths
People from Montélimar
Politicians from Auvergne-Rhône-Alpes
Legitimists
Members of the 7th Chamber of Deputies of the July Monarchy
19th-century French Catholic theologians